Max Wolff may refer to:
 Max Wolff (soldier) (1912–1945), Brazilian Army sergeant in World War II
 Max Wolff (composer) (1840–1886), Austrian composer
 Max Wolff (physician) (1844–1923), German physician